is a 1957 black-and-white jidaigeki Japanese film directed by Masahiro Makino.

Cast 
 Ryūtarō Ōtomo

References

External links 

Jidaigeki films
Japanese black-and-white films
1957 films
Films directed by Masahiro Makino
Toei Company films
1950s Japanese films